Eudiana is a genus of beetles in the family Buprestidae, containing the following species:

 Eudiana aeneipennis (Laporte & Gory, 1837)
 Eudiana aeneocuprea (Kerremans, 1903)
 Eudiana antiqua (Kerremans, 1899)
 Eudiana azteca (Obenberger, 1932)
 Eudiana bahiana (Kerremans, 1897)
 Eudiana catharinae (Thery, 1910)
 Eudiana chevrolati (Saunders, 1871)
 Eudiana chrysoloma (Mannerheim, 1837)
 Eudiana cupricollis (Kerremans, 1899)
 Eudiana dentipennis (Laporte & Gory, 1837)
 Eudiana foveola (Obenberger, 1932)
 Eudiana gebhardti (Obenberger, 1924)
 Eudiana gounellei (Kerremans, 1897)
 Eudiana goyazensis (Obenberger, 1932)
 Eudiana guianensis (Chevrolat, 1838)
 Eudiana inflammata (Laporte & Gory, 1837)
 Eudiana inornata (Gory, 1840)
 Eudiana klapaleki (Obenberger, 1924)
 Eudiana laevipennis (Kerremans, 1899)
 Eudiana limbata (Waterhouse, 1882)
 Eudiana minarum (Obenberger, 1932)
 Eudiana oberthuri (Kerremans, 1897)
 Eudiana obliquata (Laporte & Gory, 1837)
 Eudiana orientalis (Burmeister, 1872)
 Eudiana prasina (Mannerheim, 1837)
 Eudiana skrlandti (Obenberger, 1932)
 Eudiana subcuprea (Erichson, 1848)
 Eudiana viridiobscura (Laporte & Gory, 1837)

References

Buprestidae genera